Philmont Scout Ranch is located in the Sangre de Cristo Mountains of the Rocky Mountains of New Mexico. The southern part of the ranch is mostly grasslands/prairie, while the north is rocky and rugged, but a small part of the eastern area is prairie.

Geography

There are nine major watersheds at Philmont - the Rayado River, Urraca Creek, Cimarroncito Creek, Sawmill Creek, the Cimarron (La Flecha) River, Turkey Creek, Dean Canyon, the Ponil River, and Ute Creek.

Geological history
The Tooth of Time, as well as Baldy Mountain, Betty's Bra, Lover's Leap, Cathedral Rock, Hogback Ridge, and many of the ridges in the northwest of the ranch, is an igneous intrusion of dacite porphyry formed in the Paleogene Period of the Cenozoic Era some 22-40 million years ago. These intrusions were formed when magma from deep within the Earth rose through older rock layers and slowly cooled. Over many thousands of years, the older sedimentary rock eroded and left the harder igneous formation. The sedimentary rock, generally shale, acted as a mold for the intrusive magma, causing it to harden and cool where the sedimentary rock was strongest. The gold veins were discovered in between the dacite porphyry and shale.

Geological features

Aside from Baldy, the ranch contains a number of prominent peaks. The South Country is home to a series of six difficult peaks, namely Mount Phillips, Comanche Peak, Big Red, Bear Mountain, Black Mountain, and Schaefers Peak, as well as Trail Peak, which is popular for its relative ease, its nearness to Beaubien, and the wreckage of the crash of a B-24 bomber in 1942 near its summit. Of the ranch's various peaks with trail access, Black Mountain is widely considered the most difficult, followed closely by Baldy and Big Red.

Tooth of Time Ridge, and the latitude line on which it sits, mark the boundary between the central and southern sections of Philmont. The boundary between the central and northern sections is around U.S. Route 64, which runs just south of the narrowest part of the 'I'-shape, which is only a few miles across. Other prominent landmarks on the ranch include Grizzly Tooth, Window Rock, Deer Lake Mesa, and Urraca Mesa. Both its pinkish-gray color and its unusual shape make it a particularly notable geological landmark. It was well known among the overland traders on the Santa Fe Trail, who used it to mark the final seven-day push to Santa Fe, New Mexico.

Baldy Mountain, or Mount Baldy, is the highest peak in the Cimarron Range, a subrange of the Sangre de Cristo Mountains of New Mexico. Copper and gold were mined in the area starting in 1866, and the top of Baldy Mountain was developed as the Mystic Lode copper mine. Mine workings and prospects are still evident on the slopes of the mountain as well.

Mount Phillips, formerly called Clear Creek Mountain was renamed in 1960 in honor of the then living Waite Phillips, who donated the area to the Boy Scouts of America. It is the second highest peak in Philmont Scout Ranch in the central country on the western perimeter. It is an easy hike from Comanche Peak, but it is a much steeper ascent from Clear Creek to its  summit.

The mesa has a long "history" of mythical and supernatural associations, dating to the local indigenous tribes.

Ecology

Flora
Philmont supports a wide variety of flora. There are five of the Merriam life zones at Philmont - the Arctic, Hudsonian, Canadian, Transition, and Upper Sonoran zones. Trees at Philmont range from the plains cottonwood to the quaking aspen to the ponderosa pine. Wildflowers at Philmont include prickly poppy, shrubby cinquefoil, skyrocket (scarlet gilia), fairy slipper, blue columbine, and pinedrops. There are also a number of grasses, lichens, ferns, and mushrooms. Musk thistle, leafy spurge, and tamarisk are all invasive species found at Philmont.

In addition to the natural flora, Philmont grows alfalfa hay for livestock. There are  irrigated for cropland and another  for plant forage. The ranch also allows selective timbering to promote healthy forests. Backslopes of new trails and campsites are reseeded to control erosion and prevent the spread of invasive species.

Fauna
There are approximately 125 black bears on the ranch. The bears spend most of the summer looking for food, mostly plants like grass, acorns, and berries but also grubs, small animals, and carrion. Philmont also has mountain lions which feed on the native elk, deer, porcupines, mice, skunk, and rabbits. Western diamondback rattlesnakes are also found in Philmont. During the off-season, Philmont allows selective deer, elk, turkey, bear, antelope, and mountain lion hunting. Philmont also has herds of cattle that rotate through several backcountry pastures and the  buffalo pasture supports one hundred adult bison as well as their calves.

References

Philmont Scout Ranch